Renaldo and the Loaf are an English musical duo formed in 1977 consisting of David "Ted the Loaf" Janssen and Brian "Renaldo Malpractice" Poole. The two released six full-length albums, one live album, and three self-produced demos.

Sound 
Renaldo & The Loaf attempted to replicate the sound of synthesizers using acoustic instruments. They manipulated tape loops and muffled and detuned their instruments.

Background

Formation (1970 - 1976) 
David Janssen and Brian Poole met each other at school in the spring of 1970, when they bonded over a love for Tyrannosaurus Rex and began to play guitar.

Early Career (1977 - 1980) 
The two had been recording together as early as 1977, creating sound experiments that neither considered 'songs'. During this period they, along with friend Terry Nichols, worked on a four part instrumental suite titled 'Segment', which was completed in the spring of 1978.

After deciding to attempt a more song like structure in September 1978, the duo adopted the moniker Plimsollline, and discovered a newspaper ad from a record label named Raw Records asking for artists. The duo responded to this by sending a demo tape, and were quickly signed. At the suggestion of label owner 'Lee', the duo recorded an album and EP titled 'Behind Closed Curtains' and 'Tap Dance In Sushi' between September 1978 and April 1979, but shortly after the completion of the material, Lee and Raw Records disappeared, and the tapes were shelved. This brief encounter with a record label gave them the confidence they needed to approach larger labels like Virgin and Rough Trade. During their correspondence with Rough Trade, Geoff Travis suggested that the duo invest in a good multi-track tape recorder, a piece of equipment that would become essential to the sound of their debut album, Struve & Sneff. By the time Struve & Sneff began recording in April 1979, the two had already adopted the name 'Renaldo & The Loaf'.

The sessions for Struve & Sneff became a routine for Poole & Janssen. They would discuss new material and ideas during the midweek, and meet in Janssen's bedroom to record the next Saturday. They were both heavily inspired by the popular synthesizer bands of the time, but were unable to afford keyboards themselves, and so recreated synth-like noises using tape effects and treated guitars. Struve & Sneff was completed in September 1979 and was sold through mail order between 1979 - 1983 in a limited quantity of 250.

Ralph Years (1981 - 1987)

Songs For Swinging Larvae (1980 - 1981) 
Whilst on Holiday in San Francisco, Brian Poole visited 444 Grove Street, the headquarters of Ralph Records and The Residents. Whilst there, Poole unknowingly met with a member of The Residents, and gave him copy of Struve & Sneff. The Resident listened to the first three tracks, and told him it was excellent. Shortly afterwards, the two began a mail correspondence, where The Resident expressed interest in signing the band to Ralph. During these correspondences, the duo recorded and sent Ralph Records two demo tapes, Songs For The Surgery recorded from November 1979 to Mid 1980, and Hats Off, Gentlemen! completed in Autumn of 1980. These, combined with Struve & Sneff, were enough for Ralph, and Jay Clem, representative for the label, was sent to England to sign them. After this, the two started working on their first LP, Songs For Swinging Larvae, recording and writing new songs for it throughout late 1980, as well as overdubbing material from their Ralph demos. The album was finished in November 1980, and production on its follow up, Arabic Yodeling, began almost immediately afterwards in December.

Lyrically, the album was inspired by classical European literature, with Medical Man being a direct adaption of the first chapter of Arthur Conan Doyle's The Sign of the Four, Spratt's Medium being inspired by Samuel Beckett's Endgame and Ow! Stew the Red Shoe! taking lyrics from four short stories by Beckett found in a collection titled 'First Love'. The album title is a play on Frank Sinatra's Songs For Swinging Lovers.

Prior to the album's release, Renaldo & The Loaf flew to San Francisco in late February to film their Songs For Swinging Larvae music video in March. The idea was originally to film a video for 'Is Guava A Donut?', but Ralph suggested making the video a narrative about a recent abduction story.  The video, directed by Graeme Whifer, would combine three songs recorded during the album's sessions, Spratt’s Medium, Lime Jelly Grass, and an outtake, Melvyn’s Repose. They knew the video would be controversial, but thought it would get them noticed.

After the video was completed The Residents invited the duo to their studio, where they jammed. After the session, The Residents suggested that they record an album together in the remaining three days of their visit, by taking the jam and adding overdubs. On the second day, they were split into two groups. Brian Poole and his half of The Residents were set to devise lyrics and singing, whilst Dave Janssen and his half were set to consider overdubs. On the third day overdubs would be recorded, and on day four it would be mixed. This demo tape was titled '4 Daze' and was left incomplete when the two returned to England. A few weeks after they had returned, they received a cassette tape of the demo with additional overdubs made by The Residents.

Songs For Swinging Larvae, along with the music video, were released in the US through Ralph Records on April 10, 1981, and in the UK two months later in June.

Arabic Yodeling & Title In Limbo (1982 - 1983) 
Following the release of Songs For Swinging Larvae, the two began working on their third demo tape, titled 'The Serious Collection', which was sent to Ralph after its completion in July 1982. The material on this tape developed into much of their third album, Arabic Yodelling. The album was inspired by Ubu Roi by Alfred Jarry and the works of Charles Baudelaire. It was completed in January 1983, and was the first album by Renaldo & The Loaf to feature a guest musician, violinist Dave Baker, who was a friend of Brian Poole's. Baker and Janssen never met. It was also their first album to feature traditional keyboards, as the group had purchased a Casiotone 202 for use as Renaldo & The Loaf. Unlike Songs For Swinging Larvae and Struve & Sneff, the album would not have a U.K release, and would have had to have been imported from Ralph in the USA by British fans.

When The Residents visited London on their Mole Show tour on June 28, 1983, David and Brian met with The Residents backstage to discuss their '4 Daze' collaboration that they had worked together on 2 years prior. The Residents had time in their schedule to finish it in September, and so three weeks of the month were chosen for them to complete the album. Unfortunately, Janssen was unable to get time off to visit San Francisco and so Brian went by himself, taking with him tape loops created by Dave, a Bouzouki, a Rababa, and a reed instrument known as a Mesmer. Sessions for the album continued over three weeks, with The Residents' usual equipment being in transit from their Leicestershire Mole Show performance in July. They used a Yamaha Keyboard, a 'Resitar' electric guitar, a drum machine and a violin, used by Snakefinger on the track 'Africa Tree' The album, titled 'Title In Limbo', was released in November 1983.

The Elbow Is Taboo (1984 - 1987) 
Title In Limbo had made more money than any of their previous projects and gave the duo the budget they needed improve their recording set up. Brian Poole created a home studio which, unlike Janssen's bedroom, featured full mixing equipment. Poole felt this somewhat stifled his creative input, now that he was no longer able to record whenever he felt like. The duo also now had a sampler, a Roland TR-606 drum machine and a Korg SDD-1000 digital delay unit.

They began recording their follow up to Arabic Yodeling in early 1984, with sessions continuing throughout the entirety of 1985 and finishing in late 1986. During this period the duo released two archival works, an LP version of Struve & Sneff, which removed two tracks from the original cassette and added five outtakes from the original sessions was released by Ralph in 1984, and in 1985, a compilation titled 'Olleh Olleh Roctod' was released. This compilation contained rare tracks by the band, as well as two excerpts from the Elbow Is Taboo sessions 'Critical/Dance' and the title track

By the time The Elbow Is Taboo was complete, Ralph were no longer acting as the duo's primary record label, as they had moved on to the U.K based Some Bizzare records, Ralph would still release the album in the US, but were significantly less involved in the product's creation. With their previous albums, Poole and Jansseen would begin work on the follow up as soon as the master tapes had been sent to Ralph, but in this case, the duo were not pleased with the proposed artwork created by Bizzare and had to take new photographs to be used instead. This caused significant delays in the album's release and exhausted the band. They discussed ideas for a follow up at the time, but found it difficult to start anything. The album was inspired partly by French band Ptôse, who's song 'Boule' was covered by the duo.

In 1987 they recorded a cover version of 'Haul on the Bowline' for the Ralph Records anthology album 'Potatoes', but afterwards, Renaldo & The Loaf was retired.

Brian/Renaldo contributed to sporadic recordings in the 1990s. In 2006, upon the launch of the new Renaldo and the Loaf website, the duo were reunited for the first time in the better part of two decades. It however wouldn't be for 10 years when the duo would record together again.

Solo Works (1989 - 2015)

Shouting Hat / Fiction Friends (1989 - 1993) 
Two years after the retirement of Renaldo & The Loaf, Brian Poole began working with Kwesi Marles (Who had assisted Renaldo & The Loaf on the Hambu Hodo EP), and formed a group named 'Shouting Hat'. They recorded an unreleased cover of 'Ravel’s Bolero!' in 1989, and then a track titled 'Jump Jump' on the 1993 TEC Tones compilation Goobers' under the name Fiction Friends. Around this same time, TEC Tones were releasing Renaldo & The Loaf's Ralph albums on CD.

 Collective Solo works (1996 - 2015) 
In 1996 Poole worked with Frank Pahl on two songs, 'Value of Slacks', for his album 'In Cahoots', and 'Portsmouth' for his album 'Remove The Cork' In 1998, Title In Limbo was released on CD through Ralph America, followed by a CD issue of the original version of Sturve & Sneff from The Esoteric Music Group. Between 2002-2003 he worked with The Moles to record two tracks, 'Mole in a Hole' and 'We Are The Moles'. In 2005, he was asked by director and multi-instrumentalist Alex Wroten to collaborate on the end credits music for his film The Human Elbow.

19 years following his last record, Potatoes, Dave Janssen released a first solo album titled 'The Entomology of Sound' under the pseudonym 'The Darkening Scale'. The same year he also released his second album, 'Sonic Archaeology', also as The Darkening Scale. The Darkening Scale was last active in 2020. From 2007 - 2008 Janssen briefly adopted the pseudonym 'Lightness Ascending'.

 Reunions (2006 - 2013) 
The duo were reunited in 2006, to create the Renaldoloaf website. The year afterwards, they were commissioned to record three songs for the soundtrack to Kirk Mannican’s Liberty Mug. Six years later they were asked by record label Klanggalerie to create a song for a compilation album Section 25: Eigengrau. For this the duo created 'Girls Don’t Count (The Critical Mix)'

 Gurdy Hurding (2016 - present) 
In October 2016 the duo released their first studio album in 30 years, "Gurdy Hurding". In June 2018 the duo were invited by Klanggalerie to perform at its 25th Anniversary celebration, for which they performed their second ever live show, featuring a 14 song set. The following year they released the EP Song of the Lungfish, and in 2020, released two singles relating to the Covid-19 pandemic.

 Influence 
Notable artists influenced by Renaldo & The Loaf include The Residents, Frank Pahl, and Andrew Liles. The Residents, along with having worked with the duo, covered the three songs featured in Renaldo & The Loaf's Songs For Swinging Larvae music video for their Icky Flix project in 2001. Andrew Liles collaborated with the duo on his album 'Black Pool' in 2007 and performed songs written by them on the abum. Frank Pahl worked with Brian Poole in the 1990s and the two co-wrote the song 'The Value Of Slacks' together. In 2021, Klanggalerie released 'Hardly Gurning While The World Is Turning', a reworked version of Gurdy Hurding, featuring remixes from various artists such as Cult With No Name, Eric Drew Feldman, Andrew Liles, Section 25, Transglobal Underground, and The Residents.

DiscographyAlbumsCompilationsEPsSingles'''''

Filmography

Renaldo & The Loaf - 23rd Century Giants (2022) 
On March 8, 2022, Well Dang Productions released Renaldo & The Loaf - 23rd Century Giants. The film was directed by David Janssen and Alex Wroten.  It details the history of Renaldo & The Loaf, including never-before-seen material and long-forgotten novelty items.

References

External links
 Renaldo and the Loaf: The Official Site
 Renaldo and the Loaf: The Hums Do Not Intrude (archived)
 Renaldo and the Loaf's official MySpace page
  Ted the Loaf's MySpace page
  Renaldo M's MySpace page
 Especial Renaldo and the Loaf (in Spanish, a comprehensive story of the band and the commented discography)

English experimental musical groups
Avant-garde music groups
English musical duos
Surrealist groups
Some Bizzare Records artists